The Gourdou G.120 Hy was a prototype French shipboard reconnaissance floatplane. A single prototype was completed, flying for the first time in June 1940, but was destroyed later that month to avoid capture by German troops.

Development and design 

In March 1937, the French Navy issued a specification for a "light seaplane" to replace the Potez 452 and Gourdou-Leseurre GL-832 HY that operated from the French Navy's cruisers and sloops, The specification required that the new aircraft would be able to be launched by the  capacity catapults of these ships. A separate, parallel, specification was issued for a "heavy seaplane" for  catapults. The light seaplane would have a primary role of observation and reconnaissance, with secondary duties of convoy escort and ground attack in low-intensity warfare. A bomb load of eight  was specified.

The Gourdou company (formerly Gourdou-Leseurre) began work on an aircraft to meet the light seaplane requirement, the G-120 Hy, in late 1937, with chief designer G. Bruner leading the design team. The GY.120 was a twin-engined, two-seat monoplane. The wings had a light-alloy structure and fabric covering, and folded immediately outboard of the engine nacelles. Large flaps occupied the whole of the wing's trailing edge and enabled the G.120 to meet the wide speed range required by the specification. Spoilers were used for lateral control. The fuselage structure was made of welded chrome-molydennum steel tube, with the forward fuselage being clad in removable metal panels and the aft fuselage fabric covered. A twin-tail was fitted to give a better field of fire for the rear machine gun. The pilot's cockpit was situated in the nose, with the radio-operator/gunner sitting adjacent to the trailing edge. The gunner's position had a single flexibly mounted 7.5 mm Darne machine gun, with a second gun fixed in the aircraft's nose.

Testing and flight
In June 1938 full-scale wind tunnel testing of the G.120's wings and innovative system of flaps was carried out at Chalais-Meudon at the behest of the French Service Technique de l'Aéronautique. These tests were successful, and as a result, the French Navy ordered the construction of a prototype, which was completed at Gourdou's Saint-Maur-des-Fossés factory in December 1939. The prototype was then moved to Chalais-Meudon for more full-scale wind tunnel testing, which continued through to February 1940, and proved successful. 

The prototype was transferred to Athis-Mons on 1 June 1940, being launched onto the river Seine on that morning for water-taxing tests. The test pilot noted that longitudinal control was poor during the flight. Work to correct this problem could not be completed before the German army neared Paris to Paris resulted in the prototype being destroyed, with the wreckage being sunk in the Seine.

Specifications (performance estimated)

Notes

References

 

1940s French military reconnaissance aircraft
Floatplanes
Aircraft first flown in 1940